is a Japanese football player currently playing for Ventforet Kofu.

Playing career
Nakayama was born in Kanagawa Prefecture on January 22, 2001. He joined J2 League club Ventforet Kofu in 2018.

References

External links

2001 births
Living people
Association football people from Kanagawa Prefecture
Japanese footballers
J2 League players
Ventforet Kofu players
Association football midfielders